Kaririavis is an extinct genus of ornithuromorphs from the Early Cretaceous Crato Formation of Brazil. It contains one species, K. mater. It is known only from its holotype, which consists of a single foot. Kaririavis is the oldest known ornithuromorph from Gondwana.

References 

Prehistoric euornitheans
Aptian genera
Early Cretaceous dinosaurs of South America
Cretaceous Brazil
Fossils of Brazil
Crato Formation
Fossil taxa described in 2021
Taxa named by Fernando Novas